The 13th Pennsylvania House of Representatives District is located in southeast Pennsylvania and has been represented by John Lawrence since 2010.

District profile 
The 13th Pennsylvania House of Representatives District is located in Chester County and includes the following areas:

 East Nottingham Township
 Elk Township
 Franklin Township
 Highland Township
London Britain Township
 London Grove Township
 Londonderry Township
 Lower Oxford Township
 New London Township
 Oxford
 Penn Township
 Upper Oxford Township
 West Fallowfield Township
 West Grove
 West Nottingham Township

Representatives

Recent election results

References

External links
District map from the United States Census Bureau
Pennsylvania House Legislative District Maps from the Pennsylvania Redistricting Commission.  
Population Data for District 13 from the Pennsylvania Redistricting Commission.

Government of Chester County, Pennsylvania
Government of Lancaster County, Pennsylvania
13